The Battle of Trafalgar, 21 October 1805 is an 1822 painting by British artist J. M. W. Turner. It was commissioned by King George IV as a part of a series of works to decorate three state reception rooms in St James's Palace and link the Hanoverian dynasty with military success. This work was Turner's only royal commission, and was to stand as the pendant piece to Philippe-Jacques de Loutherbourg's Lord Howe's action, or the Glorious First of June.
This massive history painting measures  x  and is his largest work. It was given to Greenwich Hospital shortly after its original installation. The painting now hangs in the National Maritime Museum, also in Greenwich, London.

History
This work depicts a scene from the Battle of Trafalgar, a naval battle fought between the British and Franco-Spanish fleet off Cape Trafalgar in southwest Spain. The British had twenty-seven ships to the thirty-three of the Franco-Spanish fleet. Despite this, the British came out as decisively victorious and captured or destroyed nineteen of the Franco-Spanish ships. Admiral Nelson, of the British Navy, took an unconventional approach to this battle and split his fleet into two lines, one led by his flagship Victory and the other by his subordinate Collingwood, to attack the Franco-Spanish fleet in columns perpendicular to their line.  At the height of the battle Nelson was shot from a nearby French ship and mortally wounded. Despite this upsetting death, the victory at Trafalgar represented a crucial naval victory for the British. Their dominance effectively established them as the great naval power and ended Napoleon’s plans to conquer England. The significance of this battle for British history cannot be overstated. Afterwards, many citizens called for a government commissioned work of art depicting the battle. This reflected the role of the history painting and the artist by demonstrating the virtue of the hero, Lord Nelson, to the entire nation. The importance of Nelson and his tactics are referenced in Victorys dominating position in the scene, the execution as a history painting, and Turner's care in rendering all elements of the scene.

Role as a history painting

A history painting is traditionally defined as a large-scale work depicting a scene from the Bible, mythology, or classical history. Generally regarded as the height of artistic genres, Turner recognizes this and paints The Battle of Trafalgar as a history painting depicting a contemporary event and as a patchwork scene composed of different moments portrayed as being simultaneous. Turner knows the importance of this genre and employs it to further the significance of the contemporary scene. This action firmly cements the work as being of great national significance and affirms Britain as a great maritime power. In the pursuit of these ideals and significance, Turner took several moments from the battle, across several days, and merged them into one moment in one scene. This then represents Turner's desire to take the battle and use it to create something of general, philosophical, and national significance. This aspect, along with the pyramidal composition reference triumph and sacrifice reaffirm this work's place as a history painting, despite it not depicting one scene from ancient history, religion, or mythology.

The realism of the scene is visible in the flags of the masts, which deliver part of the famous message England expects that every man will do his duty...

Studies
The British were attempting to establish themselves as a major maritime power; with their victory in this battle they were successful and with this painting that becomes evident. Turner had a great deal of personal interest and investment in this work and with the history of the Battle of Trafalgar in general. Turner made several sketches immediately after the battle, careful studies of the ships and their rigging, and close details of the uniforms. The most notable of these early works was The Battle of Trafalgar, as Seen from the Mizen Starboard Shrouds of the Victory. This work was well received and provided the foundation from which Turner would develop Trafalgar into a scene representing an overall account of the whole battle. This earlier depiction is closer to Turner’s style in that it leans away from traditional maritime paintings and more toward the ambiguity and sublime that Turner would later be known for. In preparation for Trafalgar Turner created two preparatory oil sketches, with the First Sketch for ‘The Battle of Trafalgar’ aligning its composition with the traditional maritime paintings. The Second Sketch for ‘The Battle of Trafalgar’ moves away from this traditional style and more closely resembles his final product with a more organized chaos via the build-up of clouds and people in the foreground. Despite this work being a commission, Turner chooses to depict the final work in a style that moves away from conventional practices and closer to his original work and personal style further indicating his personal connection with Trafalgar. While the subject of the piece is evident, there are elements of ambiguity suggesting the sublime, the dissolution of space via strokes of pure paint, and the symmetry between human and natural forces.

References

Bibliography

External links
Description page at the National Maritime Museum website.

1824 paintings
Paintings by J. M. W. Turner
Cultural depictions of Horatio Nelson
Naval war paintings
Paintings in the collection of Royal Museums Greenwich
Donations from the Royal Collection
Battle of Trafalgar